Ueno Tsuruhime (上野鶴姫) was a Japanese female warrior (onna-musha) in the late-Sengoku period. She was the daughter of Mimura Iechika and wife of Ueno Takanori the last leader of Ueno clan. In 1577, she led thirty-four women in a suicidal charge against the Mōri army in the Tsuneyama castle.

Siege of Tsuneyama castle 
In 1575, the Mōri army attacked the Bicchu Matsuyama castle, after half a year of battle, Mimura clan lost the battle and Mimura Motochika (Tsuruhime's brother) killed himself.

Next Mōri army arrived at Tsuneyama mountain and encircled Tsuneyama castle. Takanori and Tsuruhime desperately fought against overwhelming army, but lost every branch castle and the number of soldiers gradually declined then the fall of castle is approaching.

Tsuruhime and her husband were determined to die and she prepared to lead a sortie out of the castle to die in battle. She then went down into the castle courtyard and invited the other women of the garrison to join her, they were very reluctant to do fear of punishment in the afterlife. Tsuruhime assured them, that they should not fear death because death on the battlefield would lead to the Western Paradise of Amida Buddha in the Pure Land. At this the castle gate was opened and Tsuruhime led a suicidal charge into the midst of the enemy, accompanied by 34 other women whom she had inspired. The first reaction from the Mori troops was one of surprise and disbelief, she advanced against the huge army and after much resistance arrived at the enemy main camp.

Ueno Tsuruhime spotted Nomi Munekatsu, the commander of Mōri army and tried to challenge him to a single combat, but Munekatsu said he would not be able to fight a woman and politely declined this request saying she was a woman of honor. Giving up the call for a challenge, Tsuruhime tendered her precious sword (known as the Kunihira Long Sword) to Munekatsu.

The victory was already decided, Ueno Tsuruhime returned to the castle and killed herself along with the thirty-four women, the last act of honor as a samurai. Ueno Takanori followed his wife to death and the history of Ueno clan at Bizen province had ended in the year of 1577.

References

External links 

 謎多き心霊スポット 常山城に眠る女の霊とは/

People of Sengoku-period Japan
Women of medieval Japan
1577 deaths
Samurai
Japanese women in warfare
16th-century Japanese people
Women in 16th-century warfare
16th-century Japanese women